411 Video Magazine (commonly abbreviated as 411VM or 411) was a skateboarding video series. 411 was created in 1993 by Josh Friedberg and Steve Douglas. 411 released four issues per year, until its last issue, issue 67 was released in 2005. Prior to 411, professional skateboarders only showcased their video footage in major video releases, which were sometimes spread years apart. 411 gave skateboarding fans access to videos of professional skateboarders more frequently than ever before.

411 was originally produced on VHS tapes, and then later transitioned to DVD.

Host 
The first 50 issues were hosted by Lance Mountain. Afterward, each issue was hosted by a special guest.

Common sections 
Openers - The best tricks of the issue, played mostly in slow motion.

Chaos - Mix of skateboarders on any terrain

Transitions - Skateboarders only skating ramps and pools

Switchstance - Only switchstance tricks

Wheels of Fortune - Amateur video spotlight and interview

Pro Files - Professional video spotlight and interview

Grapevine - Gossip and news section

Commercial Break - Advertisements

Road Trip - Skateboarders on tour

Day in the Life - Day in the life of a pro skateboarder

Industry - Profile of a skateboard company and their team

Shop Industry - Profile of a skateboard shop and local skaters

Metrospective - Profile of a city and their local skaters

Instagram account 
In 2014, the makers of 411 created an Instagram account that featured archived content from 411 along with answering frequently asked questions from fans.

References 

Skateboarding videos